This is a list of football games played by the South Korea national football team between 1990 and 1999.

Results by year

List of matches

1990

Source:

1991

Source:

1992

Source:

1993

Source:

1994

Source:

1995

Source:

1996

Source:

1997

Source:

1998

Source:

1999

Source:

See also
 South Korea national football team results
 South Korea national football team

References

External links

1990s in South Korean sport
1990